Call of the Rockies is a 1944 American Western film directed by Lesley Selander and written by Robert Creighton Williams. The film stars Smiley Burnette, Sunset Carson, Harry Woods, Kirk Alyn, Ellen Hall and Frank Jaquet. The film was released on July 14, 1944, by Republic Pictures.

Plot

Cast
Smiley Burnette as Frog Millhouse
Sunset Carson as Sunset Carson 
Harry Woods as J. B. Murdock
Kirk Alyn as Ned Crane
Ellen Hall as Marjorie Malloy
Frank Jaquet as Doc Lee
Charles Williams as Burton Witherspoon
Jack Kirk as Sheriff
Tom London as Henchman Hansen
Bob Kortman as Henchman Watson 
Edmund Cobb as Workman

See also
List of American films of 1944

References

External links 
 

1944 films
1940s English-language films
American Western (genre) films
1944 Western (genre) films
Republic Pictures films
Films directed by Lesley Selander
American black-and-white films
1940s American films